Amit Khanna (born 24 July 1984) is a film director, writer, film producer, actor and fashion photographer from Mumbai, India.

Amit made his debut as a writer with Channel V’s first ever fiction show Roomies in 2009, he made his debut as a director with a film titled Tutiya Dil in 2012, Followed by Badmashiyaan- Fun never ends in 2015. Amit struck gold with his short film An untold story of paper boats which featured in the 69th Cannes Film Festival as well as won the best short film in foreign language at the Nice Film festival 2016, He wrote directed produced and acted in India's first ever LGBTQ web series All about section 377 and Still about section 377 both these web series gained immense popularity and were big hits. All about section film cut won the best foreign language film at the Berlin international filmmakers award in 2017.

Career

Director 
Amit Khanna started off as a short film director at an extremely age his short films such as Unnoticed Love, Misunderstood, Yeh Jahaan and Squall travelled across the globe and were well received by one and all, Amit directed his first hindi film Tutiya Dil which released in the year 2012, his second Hindi feature film Badmashiyaan- fun never ends was released in 2015, he directed an award winning short film An untold story of paper boats which released in 2016 at the 69th Cannes film festival, Amit Also directed India's first LGBTQ web series – All about section 377 which apart from the web also aired on NDTV Prime in 2016–2017, he further did the second season of the hit show Still about section 377 which released on Sony Liv in 2018. Amit also directed the first ever Telugu- English cross over film Friends-in-law which was showcased in the 71st Cannes Film Festival Market.

Photographer 
Amit has been associated with international brands like Starbucks for celebrity photo shoots as well as brands like Krishna Pearls, Chromozome, Oriflame, Gatsby, Crusoe, Dr. Tvacha, Dazzler, Horra Luxury, Kodak Lens and many more.

Writer 
Amit Khanna began his writing career with Channel V’s first fiction show Roomies (2009), after which he wrote a feature films Tutiya dil (2012) and All about section 377 and a 2018 web series Still about section 377. He has also written the first ever Telugu-English cross over film Friends-in-law.

Actor 
Amit Khanna made his acting debut with the 2016 web series All about section 377: his portrayal of an overweight gay man won him accolades galore he was nominated for his performance at the prestigious Nice film festival as best actor in leading role, Amit has acted in the second season of the show Still about section 377.

Filmography

References 

Living people
Indian fashion photographers
1984 births